Captain Sir John Norman Ide Leslie, 4th Baronet (6 December 1916 – 18 April 2016), known locally as Jack Leslie, was the eldest son of Sir John Randolph Leslie, 3rd Baronet (known as Shane Leslie), and Marjorie Ide. He became the fourth baronet when his father died in 1971.

Biography
Educated at Downside School and Magdalene College, Cambridge, Leslie never married or had children. During World War II, he served as an officer in the Irish Guards during the Battle of France before being captured at Boulogne-sur-Mer. He then spent five years in POW camps.

After the war, he moved to New York City and later travelled around Europe, settling in Rome. At the age of 78 he returned to his family's homestead, Castle Leslie and travelled to Ibiza for his 85th birthday in 2001. He inadvertently revealed the wedding location of Sir Paul McCartney and Heather Mills by admitting to reporters it was to take place in Castle Leslie, but that it was "a secret". In January 2012, he appeared in the television programme Secrets of the Manor House, which discussed the Leslie family and Castle Leslie, among other manor homes. In 2015, he featured in the TV series Tales of Irish Castles. Leslie was presented with the Legion d'Honneur at the French embassy in Dublin on 9 November 2015.

Leslie survived his older sister, the author Anita Leslie (Anita Theodosia Moira Rodzianko King) and his younger brother, Desmond Arthur Peter Leslie. He was a first cousin once removed of former British Prime Minister Sir Winston Churchill as his paternal grandmother, Leonie Jerome, and Churchill's mother, Lady Randolph Churchill (born Jennie Jerome), were sisters - the daughters of American financier Leonard Jerome. His mother, Marjorie Ide, was the daughter of Henry Clay Ide, an American former Governor-General of the Philippines. In 2006 he published his autobiography Never A Dull Moment. Leslie died at the age of 99 in April 2016. As of 1 June 2021 the baronetcy is 'Vacant'.

Family

He was the elder son of Sir John Randolph Leslie, 3rd Baronet, and Marjorie Ide, daughter of General Henry Clay Ide, he was born 6 December 1916 and had an elder sister and an younger brother.

Anita Theodosia Moira Rodzianko King (21 November 1914 – 5 November 1985), novelist & biographer; was married (secondly) to Commander Bill King, World War II submarine commander and yachtsman; had two children.
Desmond Arthur Peter Leslie (29 June 1921 – 21 February 2001), pilot, film maker, writer, and musician. Twice married, he had five children.
Sammy Leslie, niece, hotelier and media personality. Daughter of Desmond Leslie.

References

External links
Profile, imdb.com; accessed 19 April 2016.
Castle Leslie profile, castleleslie.com

1916 births
2016 deaths
Alumni of Magdalene College, Cambridge
Baronets in the Baronetage of the United Kingdom
Irish Guards officers
People educated at Downside School
20th-century Anglo-Irish people